Delta Force: Land Warrior is a tactical first-person shooter video game. It is the third game in the Delta Force series developed and published by NovaLogic, and is the sequel to Delta Force 2. A stand-alone expansion pack, Delta Force: Task Force Dagger, was released in 2002.

Gameplay
Delta Force: Land Warrior features 30 missions. The game takes place in various places including Africa, Indonesia,  Western Egypt and South America. Objectives range from eliminating high-risk targets such as power plants to rescuing VIPs held hostage. Before deployment, players get briefed and are tasked with picking the specific equipment and gear they want for the mission, allowing them to define their strategy beforehand, e.g.: a stealthy approach with silenced weaponry, or an all-out assault with heavy weaponry. 

The player is inserted into the objective area by a multitude of means, including insertion by helicopter or parachute. Once on the ground, players can navigate the terrain through a use of a mini-map, containing waypoints pointing the player to their objective(s). In certain missions, the player leads a squad, allowing him to issue orders to his teammates, although the majority of missions pits the player alone against the enemy. A map editor is included, allowing players to modify existing maps, or create new ones.

Multiplayer
Multiplayer allows up to 50 players to compete in the game modes Deathmatch, Team Deathmatch, King Of The Hill, Capture the Flag, Flagball, in which up to 4 teams compete in order to capture one flag located in the middle of the battlefield, and Coop mode, which allows four players to work together to complete the standard singleplayer missions.

Synopsis
The game starts with the hostage rescue in one of the Great Pyramids of Giza. It is later discovered that the terrorists involved belong to the Armed People's Front (APF), a group that is opposed to Western involvement in the Middle East and is planning attacks on Western factions in Egypt. The Delta team seizes weapons caches at a dig site in Western Egypt and is led to the capture of APF's leader, Meinhard Kreider, in a raid on his fortress.

After Kreider's arrest, the terrorist front New Dawn is revealed by Nikogos Fazekas, who is intent on getting Kreider released from a NATO prison. New Dawn and the remnants of APF forces lead an attack on a Mediterranean oilrig but are stopped by the Delta team. A New Dawn launches several attacks on the West, from taking hostages in Mayan ruins to hiding weapons and drugs in Lebanon and Indonesia. A Spetsnaz officer taken hostage in Lebanon is rescued in a heavily defended compound by the Delta Team. The squad then destroys drug shipments in Indonesia. A New Dawn training facility is neutralized during an ambush in the Banda Sea. Later, the head of the World Bank is rescued in a Japanese saiguden. Finally, the team comes together to rescue the American ambassador to Mexico in the Palenque Ruins and stops the delivery of a radiological bomb from the Yucatan to Los Angeles. However, another radiological bomb escaped to an abandoned detention center near Ciudad Juarez but was seized in time by Delta Force members Snakebite and Pitbull.

Kreider is finally released by NATO forces in a ploy to corner Fazekas. Kreider is recaptured on his way to Colombia and Fazekas is tracked to Easter Island, where he is killed in an underground labyrinth of tunnels. The APF and New Dawn are broken up after Fazekas' death and Kreider's recapture.

Engine 
Delta Force: Land Warrior uses a new hybrid engine that uses hardware acceleration for polygonal buildings and other structures but retains the voxel-based terrain of its predecessors, with improved resolution however. Draw distances remain on the same level as in the earlier engines and maps are looped in all directions so there are no visible map borders. The new engine also allows for tunnel complexes, featured prominently in the campaign and showcased in the first mission which mostly takes place in Egyptian ruins.

Development
The game was announced at E3 2000 and was originally scheduled to release in Fall 2000.

Reception

In the United States, Land Warrior sold 280,000 copies and earned $7.6 million by August 2006, after its release in November 2000. It was the country's 71st best-selling computer game between January 2000 and August 2006. Combined sales of all Delta Force computer games released between January 2000 and August 2006 had reached 1.7 million units in the United States by the latter date. The game received "average" reviews according to video game review aggregator Metacritic.

References

Further reading
 Review by John Callaham

External links
 Official website
 

2000 video games
Cooperative video games
Delta Force (video game series)
First-person shooters
NovaLogic games
Tactical shooter video games
Video game sequels
Video games about Delta Force
Video games developed in the United States
Video games featuring female protagonists
Video games set in Colombia
Video games set in East Timor
Video games set in Easter Island
Video games set in Egypt
Video games set in the Federated States of Micronesia
Video games set in Greece
Video games set in Hokkaido
Video games set in Honduras
Video games set in Indonesia
Video games set in Italy
Video games set in Japan
Video games set in Lebanon
Video games set in Mexico
Video games set in New Mexico
Video games set in North Carolina
Video games set in Russia
Video games with expansion packs
Windows games
Windows-only games